Heterolophus is a genus of pseudoscorpions in the family Tridenchthoniidae. There are at least four described species in Heterolophus.

Species
These four species belong to the genus Heterolophus:
 Heterolophus australicus Beier, 1969
 Heterolophus clathratus (Tullgren, 1907)
 Heterolophus guttiger Tömösváry, 1884
 Heterolophus nitens Tömösváry, 1884

References

Further reading

External links

 

Tridenchthoniidae
Pseudoscorpion genera